Hernán Rodríguez (born 2 May 1933) is a Chilean footballer. He played in 22 matches for the Chile national football team from 1955 to 1961. He was also part of Chile's squad for the 1959 South American Championship that took place in Argentina.

References

External links
 
 

1933 births
Living people
Chilean footballers
Chile international footballers
Footballers from Santiago
Association football midfielders
Colo-Colo footballers
Badminton F.C. footballers
Rangers de Talca footballers